Chivalry is a 2022 British comedy-drama television series broadcast on Channel 4. It was written by and stars Steve Coogan and Sarah Solemani.

Cast
 Steve Coogan as Cameron
 Sarah Solemani as Bobby
 Sienna Miller as Lark
 Wanda Sykes as Jean Shrill
 Lolly Adefope as Ama 
 Aisling Bea

Episodes
All episodes were made available on All4 following the first episode's premiere on 21 April 2022.

Production
On 13 January 2020, it was announced that Steve Coogan and Sarah Solemani were writing a six episode comedy-drama series about the "sexual politics in the wake of the #MeToo movement" for Channel 4. The series is executive produced by Christine Langan from Coogan's Baby Cow Productions.

Notes

References

External links
 Chivalry on All 4
 

2022 British television series debuts
2020s British comedy-drama television series
2020s British workplace comedy television series
2020s British workplace drama television series
Channel 4 comedy dramas
English-language television shows